Visakha Law College or VLC is a private law school situated beside National Highway 16, at Christ Vidya Nagar, Bheemili Mandal in Visakhapatnam in the Indian state of Andhra Pradesh. The law school offers 3 years LL.B. (Hons), five-years integrated B.A., LL.B. and two years LL.M. courses approved by the Bar Council of India (BCI), New Delhi and affiliated to Andhra University. This Law institute was established in 2009.

References

Law schools in Andhra Pradesh
Universities and colleges in Andhra Pradesh
Colleges affiliated to Andhra University
Educational institutions established in 2009
2009 establishments in Andhra Pradesh